Dambala is a village in the gadag district  of the state of Karnataka, India. It was an ancient center of Buddhism and remained so as late as the 12th century.

Demographics
 India census, Dambala had a population of 10,095	with 5,166 males and 4,929 females and 1,815 Households.

History

Under the rule of the Mauryas and Satavahana, the teachings of Buddha flourished in Karnataka. Buddhist relics are found scattered around the town.

In a temple of the Buddhist deity Tara in Dambal, there is an inscription dated 1095 AD, a temple built by 16 merchants for the deity Tara and a vihara for Buddhist monks. Although Buddhism was assimilated by the growing popularity of Hinduism, there was a Buddhist centre in Dambal as late as the 12th century.

Doddabasappa Temple

There are three Hindu temples here.
The Doddabasappa Temple is of the Western Chalukya architectural style and has a twenty-four pointed stellate plan for the vimana with so many star points that it almost becomes circular in appearance.  Each right angle is divided into four 22.5 degrees angles. Then each angle is again divided and covered with intricate carvings.

Jappadbavi
Recently discovered the temple well locals call it as Jappadbavi

Kappata gudda
Kappata gudda hill is very near to Dambal, the famous Kappata Malleshwara Temple is about 5 miles from Dambal.

See also
 North Karnataka
 Tourism in North Karnataka
 Gadag
 Lakkundi
 Mahadeva Temple (Itagi)
Vesara

External links

 History of Indian Art
 
 Deccan-herald: Dambal
 Dambal a religious symphony
 Dusty Dambal? Think again!

Notes

Buddhist sites in Karnataka
Cities and towns in Gadag district
Western Chalukya Empire
Buildings and structures in Gadag district
Buddhist temples in Karnataka